Jaeson Ma (Chinese: 馬正遠; pinyin: Mǎ Zhēngyuǎn; born November 11, 1980) is an American serial entrepreneur, artist, and media executive. He is the founder of the east-west talent, brand strategy & investment firm East West Ventures (formerly known as East West Artists), a co-founder of 88rising, and a co-founder of Stampede Ventures.

Ma is a strategic advisor and financier of the social music video app Triller, [ZASH Global Media], and general partner at [Caravan Digital Studios].

Early life and education
Ma was born in Lubbock, Texas. Ma is the youngest of three children and had a difficult childhood in San Jose, California. Ma earned degrees in Bible theology, business management, and youth ministry from William Jessup University. Later, Ma earned a Master of Arts in Global Leadership and Intercultural Studies from Fuller Theological Seminary.

Career

East West Ventures 

In 2012, Ma founded East West Ventures (EWV, formerly known as East West Artists). An HTC Portfolio Company, EWV incubates and invests in disruptive opportunities across diverse sectors such as media & entertainment, frontier technology, and consumer goods. In 2019, East West Ventures rebranded from East West Artists to East West Ventures.

Ma is currently the CEO of East West Ventures.

Prior to this, Ma was a partner with Adventures Corp and Plan C Management, managing international talent, including Far East Movement, MC Jin, Daniel Wu, and Vanness Wu, between 2008 and 2011.

88rising 

In 2015, Ma co-founded 88rising, a multi-platform digital media company. 88rising provides Asia-related digital content catering to the Asian millennial market. The company has gained popularity as a digital music platform and label primarily for Asian artists, such as Keith Ape, Rich Brian (formerly known as Rich Chigga), Joji, and Higher Brothers.

In 2017, advertising agency WPP made a strategic investment in 88rising.

Ma served as chairman and co-founder of 88rising between 2015 and 2017.

Stampede Ventures 
In 2017, Ma co-founded Stampede Ventures with Greg Silverman. In 2020, the company signed a first-look deal with CBS Studios International. In 2022, Anderson Paak announced to make feature directorial debut With dramatic comedy K-POPS! for Stampede Ventures.

Triller 
Ma is a Strategic Advisor, Financier, and Principle of the social music video app Triller.

In September 2020, Ma brokered and put together the comeback fight between Mike Tyson and Roy Jones Jr, which ended up launching his boxing career.

EST Media Holdings 
In 2020, Ma founded EST Media Holdings alongside co-founder Eric Tu, executive of Vice Media and Anonymous Content. There are the following subsidiary companies under EST Media, Eastern Standard Times, EST Studios, and OP3N. Ma stated, "The steady rise in popularity of Asian content all over the world is a testament to the potential for the continent to become a powerhouse in entertainment. The team we've assembled at EST Studios has the experience and relationships that will bring together the best from East and West to tell the stories that can unite us." Jaeson Ma has also been featured in Variety 500.

EST Studios develops, finances, and produces premium long-form storytelling from Asia to the world, representing the best Asian content globally. This enterprise aims to be the first global media company that can unify the voices of Asian filmmakers to tell Asian stories. The company is currently eyeing an annual slate of 15 projects they will be financing, producing, and representing for sales at global film markets such as the EFM, Cannes, and the AFM. By July 2022, EST Studios has acquired sales and distribution rights for multiple Asian contents, such as Vietnamese sci-fi Maika, Chinese-American family drama Beneath The Banyan Tree, Sundance entry Every Day In Kaimuki, Ann Hu's bilingual drama Confetti, and Tribeca premiered documentary Hidden Letters.

EST Studios also announced a co-production partnership with Taiwan-based Studio76. Together they are targeting an initial slate of six films across all genres aimed primarily at the Asian market. EST Studios has also partnered with Ace Studios.

Working with EST Studios is Eastern Standard Times, a Gen Z-focused global media platform showcasing and celebrating Asian youth narratives. Recently, this company launched in Australia and is scheduled to release content three times a week across Tiktok, Instagram, Twitter, and Facebook.

OP3N 
In 2021, Ma announced the launch of the web3 social media platform OP3N, an NFT-based app for community building. This decentralized "community economy" allows creators and fans to connect/create/build using multi-chain, multi-wallet. OP3N received seed funding from investors such as Warner Music Group, Galaxy Interactive, Blue Run Ventures, founders of Axie Infinity, Yield Guild Games, Twitch, and Animoca Brands.

In March 2022, OP3N partnered with Avalanche Foundation to initiate "Culture Catalyst," a $100 million investment to fund and develop arts, entertainment, and culture projects by Ava Labs. Launching on the Avalanche public blockchain, Culture Catalyst has announced plans to launch several projects via the OP3N platform.

One of the first projects to be undertaken via Culture Catalyst is an "intergalactic children's Metaverse book" with Canadian artist Grimes. Announced in the 2022 Avalanche Summitt in Barcelona, Grimes told the audience, "I'm very excited to be partnering with OP3N to launch a series of educational art for babies and small children with the goal of creating a profound experience for babies that is also deeply meaningful to adults. OP3N represents the future of art funding, and Avalanche is offering the solutions we've all been needing and wanting from the crypto community".

Culture Catalyst has partnered with artist Ava Max to release a music video project alongside director Joseph Kahn. John Wu, president of Ava Labs, claimed, "the Avalanche Foundation's Culture Catalyst Initiative with OP3N marks a watershed moment for entertainment and pop culture applications on Avalanche. Users can expect the already robust Avalanche NFT scene to grow into new areas and be part of a fresh chapter in the history of culture on Web3." The music video "Maybe You're The Problem" premiered on YouTube on April 28, 2022, and has received over 16 million views within 3 months.

In June 2022, Culture Catalyst also announced to launch of a musical film with American Idol creator Simon Fuller's pop idol group Now United via the OP3N platform. This live-action musical is designed to inspire students to create their version of performances featured in the film and compete in a contest via the OP3N platform. Fuller claims, "This project allows me to redefine how an audience can engage with content. Not only can it be enjoyed simply as entertainment, but you can actually participate, initially through learning and then by creating your own version of the musical with your friends or school. It is a celebration of the art of musical theater and the passion for self-expression and new technology that allows people to get involved in ways never before imagined."

In July 2022, Ma, co-producer at Anonymous Content, partnered with Phil Gellatt, a director of the Netflix series Love, Death, and Robots, to develop the web3 series/game title Ghosts of the Deep. This sci-fi adventure game and series will be launched through the blockchain infrastructure provider OP3N.

In September 2022, Tokyo label AMBUSH announced the Limited-Edition Wearable NFT, a metaverse venture "A3" in partnership with  OP3N and Avalanche's Culture Catalyst, a USD 100M fund promoting arts and entertainment projects on the Avax ecosystem. Upon launching on September 12, 2023, A3 NFTs will be available to mint, with AMBUSH POW!®️ REBOOT and POW!®️ GITD NFT holders on the A3 purchase allowlist.

As the co-founder of OP3N, Ma was invited to speak at EthDenver 2022, The New Context Conference 2022 Tokyo, Consensus 2022, NFTCannes 2022, and Token2049 2022, focusing on the topic of "Turning Creators into Community in Web3'.

Investing 
In 2018, Ma initiated and advised on the acquisition of Dark Horse Comics by Cenic Media (Shanghai).

In 2019, Ma structured the deal creating the joint venture between Proxima Media and National Arts Studios, one of the largest film studios in China.

Ma also strategically advised on the merger and acquisition of Triller & MashTraxx in 2019. In 2020 Ma brokered the deal between Triller & FrontLine Battle to bring Mike Tyson back from retirement in a PPV boxing exhibition match against Roy Jones Jr.

Ma is also a venture partner with GoodWater Capital. Before that, he worked with MC Hammer in Silicon Valley focusing on angel stage investments in consumer tech and media, investing in numerous ventures including Justin Lin’s Asian American independent film “Better Luck Tomorrow.” Venture investments include PCA (Plan C Agency), Brain Inc, Slock.it, Musical.ly, Grab, Kind Heaven, OurSong, Triller, Coinbase, Xiaopeng, ZASH (Vinco Ventures, Inc) and the Maum Group.

Ma is currently also a senior advisor to the KKFarm fund, a joint partnership between the two largest digital music streaming platforms in Greater China.

Ministry
Following his conversion, Ma served as a missionary, church planter, and author. Ma ministered on various college campuses including San Jose State University and UCLA and planted over 200 campus church movements around the world. Using this experience, he wrote The Blueprint: A Revolutionary Plan to Plant Missional Communities on Campus.

In 2004, Ma was ordained as a minister under Harvest International Ministries by Pastor Che Ahn.

Music
Ma grew up listening to all genres of music, specifically hip-hop, rock, and gospel. Musical influences include Run DMC, Will Smith, MC Hammer, Mariah Carey, 2Pac, Nas, Sean Diddy Combs, Notorious B.I.G., Wu-Tang Clan, Hieroglyphics, Living Legends, Pharcyde, U2, Nirvana, Lifehouse, Switchfoot, Coldplay, Delirious, Jason Upton, P.O.D., and KRS-One. His music has been described as a hybrid of hip-hop and spoken word.

Ma’s musical journey began in underground hip hop clubs in Northern California where he would compete in rap battle competitions. In 1998, he dropped his first mixtape titled “2 Sides 2 Everything.”

In 2007, he formed Christian based hip-hop duo “Namesake” with Mike Whang and released the “Heartback” EP. The album got into the hands of Plan C Management, which managed Asian American rap artists Far East Movement and MC Jin at the time. Plan C signed Ma, and his third album “GLORY” released in 2010 featured Bruno Mars on the debut single “Love,” which garnered international recognition and mainstream popularity.

In 2013, Ma recorded and released independently a double album titled “Confession X Resurrection” where Ma details his experience between 2011-2012.

In 2015, Ma teamed up with Mase to write and record “Revival or Riot,” a full album project still in development. In 2017, Ma released the first single “Revival or Riot” (co-written and produced by MASE).

Awards, honors, and associations 
Ma has been recognized for the following:

Tatler Asia's 2021 GenT Next Generation Leaders 
Christianity Today’s 2014 “33 Under 33”
Charisma’s 2010 “21 Emerging Leaders of Tomorrow’s Church”

Ma is involved in the following organizations:

 Asian World Film Festival
 Chinese American Film Festival
 Milken Institute - Young Leaders Circle (YLC)

Public speaking and media

Podcasts 
 Crazy Smart Asian: 88rising Co-Founder Jaeson Ma On The Impending Dominance Of Asian Culture
 Coastal Regen
 The Quest Pod with Justin Kan: Jaeson Ma: East, West, One Nation, Under God | EW Ventures, 88rising, Hip-Hop and Linsanity
 The Unicorns Podcast: Goodwater Capital Investor Story: Empowering exceptional entrepreneurs who are changing the world
 Asian Hustle Network: Jaeson Ma, Ep 56, Revolutionizing Media Through 88rising
 Word on C Street: Jaeson Ma on How Storytelling Can Counter the Model Minority Myth and Lift AAPI Communities Higher
 Anything is Possible with Patrick Tsang: Jaeson Ma: Serial Entrepreneur Invests in Triller | Anything is Possible with Patrick Tsang
 D Network: #5 Jaeson Ma - Building Triller, TikTok's Top Competitor, and Realizing Potential of Asian Superheroes

Filmography

Discography

Publications

References 

1980 births
20th-century Protestants
21st-century Protestants
American male musicians
American male rappers
American musicians of Chinese descent
Living people
American Charismatics
Converts to Christianity
People from Lubbock, Texas